The LSBL Championships (Latvijas Sieviešu basketbola līga) is an annual tournament for Latvian women's basketball teams in the Latvian Basketball League (LBL). The tournament has been held since 1992.

History
Notable professional players who have played in the LSBL Championships tournament include Anna DeForge, Mara Mote, Kitija Laksa, Marina Mabrey, and others.

Champions

References

External links
Latvian championship women's basketball

Latvia
Basketball in Latvia
Sports leagues established in 1991